Anthology of Tom Waits is the first "best of" compilation of Tom Waits recordings, with tracks taken from his albums for Asylum Records.

The cover is by Matt Mahurin

Track listing
Songs written by Tom Waits, except where noted.

"Ol' '55" (from Closing Time) – 3:55
"Diamonds on My Windshield" (from The Heart of Saturday Night) – 3:10
"Heart of Saturday Night" (from The Heart of Saturday Night) – 3:50
"I Hope That I Don't Fall in Love With You" (from Closing Time) – 3:52
"Martha" (from Closing Time) – 4:26
"Tom Traubert's Blues (Four Sheets to the Wind in Copenhagen)" (from Small Change) – 6:32
"The Piano Has Been Drinking (Not Me)" (from Small Change) – 3:37
"I Never Talk to Strangers" (from Foreign Affairs) – 3:37
"Somewhere (From West Side Story)" (Bernstein, Sondheim) (from Blue Valentine) – 3:50
"Burma Shave" (from Foreign Affairs) – 6:40
"Jersey Girl" (from Heartattack and Vine) – 5:08
"San Diego Serenade" (from The Heart of Saturday Night) – 3:25
"A Sight for Sore Eyes" (from Foreign Affairs) – 4:39

References

Anthology of Tom Waits
Anthology of Tom Waits
Asylum Records compilation albums